Åsen may refer to:

People
Gjermund Åsen (born 1991), a Norwegian footballer who plays for Tromsø

Places
Åsen, a village in Levanger municipality in Trøndelag county, Norway
Åsen (municipality), a former municipality (1838-1962) in the old Nord-Trøndelag county, Norway
Åsen Station, a railway station located in the village of Åsen in Levanger municipality in Trøndelag county, Norway
Åsen Church, a church located in the village of Åsen in Levanger municipality in Trøndelag county, Norway
Åsen, Oslo, a neighborhood divided between the boroughs of Sagene and Nordre Aker in Oslo, Norway
Åsen, Sweden, a village in Älvdalen Municipality in Dalarna county, Sweden

See also
Aasen (disambiguation), an alternate (older) spelling of Åsen
Asen (disambiguation), a similar spelling to Åsen